SM Aslam Talukder (14 April 1964 – 17 February 2008), known by his stage name Manna, was a Bangladeshi film actor and producer. Manly Hero title holder, Superstar Manna is hailed in the media as the Dhallywood Yuvraj, the Mahanayak and the Megastar.

Manna is widely regarded as one of the greatest actors and latest Mahanayak of Dhaliwood cinema's golden era. In his 24 years career he has acted in more than three hundred films.
He earned numerous accolades in his long career, including one National Film Award, three Meril Prothom Alo Awards, and five Bachsas Awards He earned a Bangladesh National Film Award for Best Actor for his role in the film Bir Soinik (2003).

Early life
Manna was born on 14 April 1964 at Elenga in Tangail District. He acted in over 200 films. His acting career started in 1984 after he was discovered through a talent search program by the National Film Development Corporation of Bangladesh.

Career
Manna was the General Secretary of the Bangladesh Film Actors Association. As the general secretary, he was active in the ongoing movement against vulgarity in the Dhallywood film industry.

One of the first films that brought him to attention was Danga (1992). Other commercially successful movies are Traash, Chadabaaz and 'Ammajan'.

Montajur Rahman Akbar's 'Shanto Keno Mastan' and ‘Ke Amar Baba’ were released in 1998 and 1999. In 1999, the movie 'Ammajan' directed by Kazi Hayat released. The film established Manna into a permanent position in Bangla film history as it was one of the most successful commercial films of Bengali film history.

On average, Manna acted in 10 films each year. Among films released last year, he played lead roles in commercially successful films including Saajghor, Khomotar Garom, Moner Shathey Juddho, Machine-man, Ulta Palta 69 and Shotru Shotru Khela. Manna received several prestigious awards including a National Film Award for Best Actor in 2005.

As an action hero, Manna acted in collaboration with action director Kazi Hayat's 20 films and Montazur Rahman Akbar's 22 films.

Early career (1984-1990) 
Manna was selected in 1984 in search of a new face organized by the Bangladesh Film Development Corporation (FDC). Acting in the 1985 film "Pagli" directed by Kazi Hayat He made his film debut. Although his first film was  Taoba . He then starred opposite Nipa Mona Lisa in Shimul Parul(1985), Nispaap (1986) opposite Rehana Jolly, Baap Beta 420 (1987) against Kobita, Bhai (1987) against Champa, Amar Jaan (1988), Badsha against Sunetra Bhai (1989), Cobra (1989), Goriber bondhu opposite Champa (1990), Amma (1990), Nishpap Shishu (1990), opposite Rani Stree . He acted in films like Palki (1990), Dukhi Ma (1990).

Establishment profit (1991-1996) 
Manna starred opposite Champa for the first time in the 1991 film Kashem Malar Prem directed by Mostafa Anwar. If the film is a commercial success, he also gets a chance to work in a few films.

He also starred as a solo actor in 1992 in Kazi Hayat's  Danga  and Tras. In the same year, he starred in Mostafa Anwar's Andh Prem, Montazur Rahman Akbar's Prem Diwana and Disco Dancer, Pitar Adesh of Montazur Rahman Akbar, Shadi Mubarak of Ashok Ghosh, Gorom Haoya of Bulbul Ahmed, Sakkhat of Saiful Azam Kashem, Kamal Ahmed's Obuj Shishu, Delwar Jahan Jhantu 's Goriber Bondu are released.

In 1993, he was the Chadabaj, Sepahi, Deshdrohi,dhar, Teji of 'Kazi Hayat. Somaj ke bodle dao, Nur Hossain Balair's Ora Tin jon and Sesh Khela, Nadeem Mahmud's Andolan, Ruti and Rajpather Raja, MA Malek's Durnitibaj, FI Manik's Bishal Akraman, Mostafizur Rahman Babur's Chirorini, AJ Rana directed Manush, directed by Belal Ahmed He has acted in films likeSakshi Praman and Bashira directed by Montazur Rahman Akbar.

Success and popularity (1997-2008) 
Manna produced the 1997 film LootToraz directed by Kazi Hayat, starring Moushumi and Diti opposite him. The film was also a commercial success. Then Enayet Karim's Hunger Burning, Ispahani Arif Jahan's Mostafa Bhai, Delwar Jahan Jhantu's Raja Bangladeshi, etc. movies are released.

Released in 1999, he starred in the Kazi Hayat-directed film 'Ammajan', where he co-starred with Shabnam, Amin Khan and Moushumi . He won first Bachsas Award and Meril Prothom Alo Awards for his performance in the film. In the same year, he directed Raihan Mujib and Aziz Ahmed Babul's Khabar Hare, Malek Afsary's film Lal Badshah, which he also produced.

In 2000, his third film, Abbajan, was released. It won the Bacchus Award in two categories. The same year he Malek Afsari directed Death Bite, Chhatku Ahmed Managed End War, Montazur Rahman Akbar's "Gunda Number One", "Infamous Killer", "Hit Counter Hit", "Mastan on Mastan" and "Life is a Clash", Kazi Hayat's Present, F I Manik Sultan, Badiul Alam Khokon ' "Monster", "Husband and Wife's War" directed by F I Manik, which is also the fourth film he has produced, and "Change Society" directed by Kazi Hayat.
In 2003, he acted in the movie Bir Soinik based on the story of the liberation war directed by Delwar Jahan Jhantu. " Through this film he won the Best Actor in the National Film Award. 'Bir Soinik' directed by Jahan Jhantu and released in 2003. >
This year, Zillur Rahman directed "Imandar Mastan", Ispahani Arif Jahan Directed by "Nayak", Kazi Hayat's "Minister" and "Kasht" ', Malek Afsari's' Bomb Attack, Wet Cat directed by Shahidul Islam Khokon, FI Manik directed and self-produced Two Brides One Husband, Mostafi Jur Rahman Babu's  Ashanto Agun ,  Villain  directed by Ispahani Arif Jahan, Montazur Rahman Akbar's "Arman" and "Top Samrat", Shahadat Hossain Liton Directed by Kathin Purush, Badiul Alam Khokon Directed by Rustam, FI Manik's' 'Bhaiya' ', starring opposite him Indian film actress Rachna Banerjee, Badiul Alam Khokon's Destruction, Father's Oath and Real Films like Shahin-Sumon, Neta, Monwar Khokon's Satyer Vijay, Sharif Uddin Khan Dipur's Bachao Desh, Ahmed Nasir's War with Mind were released.

Death
Manna died on 17 February 2008 following a heart attack at age 43.

Filmography

Awards and honours

References

External links 
 

1964 births
2008 deaths
Bangladeshi male film actors
People from Tangail District
20th-century Bangladeshi male actors
Best Actor National Film Award (Bangladesh) winners